Levoncourt may refer to the following places in France:

 Levoncourt, Meuse, a commune in the Meuse department
 Levoncourt, Haut-Rhin, a commune in the Haut-Rhin department